CIRP-FM (94.7 MHz) is a non-profit radio station which broadcasts a Christian radio format from Spryfield, Nova Scotia, and serving the Halifax, Nova Scotia market.  The station is owned by City Church of Halifax on Herring Cove Road.  CIRP-FM plays Light Christian Contemporary music in the morning and Southern Gospel music later in the day.

History

On March 16, 2011, City Church Halifax applied for a new English-language Christian FM radio station at Spryfield. The new station would broadcast on the frequency 94.7 MHz (channel 234LP) with an effective radiated power of 50 watts, using a non-directional antenna with a height above average terrain of 8.3 metres. On September 16, 2011, City Church Halifax received approval by the Canadian Radio-television and Telecommunications Commission (CRTC) to operate the new FM station at Spryfield.

The station was given the call sign CIRP-FM and branded on air as Life 94.7 FM.

References

External links
www.life947fm.com - the official site of CIRP-FM 94.7.
www.citychurchhalifax.ca - the official site of City Church Halifax, owners of CIRP-FM 94.7.
 

Irp
Radio stations established in 2011